Muzaffarpur Airport is located at Muzaffarpur (besides NH 722 Muzaffarpur - Chhapra (Rewa Ghat)) in the state of Bihar, in India. It was to be built for the arrival of Indira Gandhi, the then Prime Minister of India. From 1967 to 1982, flights for Patna operated on a regular basis from airport based in Patahi,

In 2018, this airport was added to UDAN in order to connect people with other cities. RITES delegates surveyed and submitted report. Later ₹60 crore has been issued to reestablish this airport so that flights for Kolkata, Ranchi, Varanasi, Gaya etc. in a 30 to 60 seater plane can fly soon.

The Government is working on the proposal to arrange 410 acres land for future development. In a letter to the Chief Minister Nitish Kumar, the Aviation Minister, Jyotiraditya Scindia demands 475 acres of land to develop Muzaffarpur Airport.

The airport is located at an elevation of 174 feet (53 m) above mean sea level. It has one paved runway designated 10/28 which measures 3,990 ft (1,216 m) with asphalt surface.

See also
Jay Prakash Narayan International Airport
Darbhanga Airport
Gaya Airport
Purnea Airport
Raxaul Airport

References

Airports in Bihar
Buildings and structures in Muzaffarpur
Transport in Muzaffarpur
1967 establishments in Bihar
Airports established in 1967
20th-century architecture in India